Jewish Center of Lake Huntington is a historic synagogue located at Lake Huntington in Sullivan County, New York.  It was built in 1896 as an auto shop and tire vulcanizing garage and altered to its current use in 1936. It is a two-story rectangular building, three bays wide and six bays deep.  The first floor is constructed of brick, with a frame story above.  The facade is coated in stucco.

It was added to the National Register of Historic Places in 2009.

References

Synagogues on the National Register of Historic Places in New York (state)
Synagogues in Sullivan County, New York
National Register of Historic Places in Sullivan County, New York
Synagogues completed in 1896
Synagogues completed in 1936